The All-Ukrainian Chornobyl People's Party "For the Welfare and Protection of the People" is a political party in Ukraine registered in October 1998.

History
The party first participated 2006 Ukrainian parliamentary election as part of the election bloc "People's Power" that did not win any seats in the Ukrainian parliament. In the 30 September 2007 elections, the party failed as part of the Ukrainian People's Bloc to win parliamentary representation. The party did not participate in the 2012 parliamentary elections. The party did not participate in the 2014 Ukrainian parliamentary election either.

References

Political parties in Ukraine